On 4 August 2018, a Junkers Ju 52 passenger aircraft operated by Ju-Air crashed near Piz Segnas, Switzerland, while en route from Locarno to Dübendorf. All 20 people on board were killed.

It was the first fatal crash of a Ju-Air aircraft since the company began operations in 1982. The cause of the crash was investigated jointly by the Swiss Transportation Safety Investigation Board (STSB) and the cantonal police of Grisons on behalf of the federal and cantonal prosecutors' offices.

The final STSB report on the accident, released on 28 January 2021, indicated that the accident was caused by the two highly experienced pilots flying recklessly, disregarding regulations, failing to anticipate expected turbulence, and failing to control the aircraft to prevent it from stalling and spinning into the ground. The report also found that the aircraft was not airworthy at the time of flight, in that the engines were not producing their minimum rated power and that the company had a deficient safety culture of rule breaking.

Accident

The aircraft was flying from Locarno Airport to Dübendorf Air Base, on the return leg of a two-day trip. The weather was unseasonably warm with choppy winds.

Swiss authorities stated that the plane appeared to have crashed almost vertically and at high speed. A witness at nearby Segnas Pass saw the Junkers approaching from the south and fly by the Martinsloch, a distinctive  breakthrough, or hole, in the Tschingelhörner mountain ridge, next to the pass. Then, instead of flying over the ridge, the aircraft made a sharp turn, dived vertically and crashed onto the plateau below. Around 10 minutes before the crash, another witness had observed the Ju 52 suddenly banking sharply to the left and losing altitude, before increasing engine power and recovering to normal flight.

The aircraft was carrying three crew and seventeen passengers, all Swiss apart from an Austrian couple and their son. Nine were women and eleven were men.

Aircraft and crew

The aircraft involved was a tri-motor Junkers Ju 52/3mg4e, registration HB-HOT, msn 6595. It had served with the Swiss Air Force from 1939 to 1985, when it was acquired by the Association of the  Friends of the Swiss Air Force, which operated under the name Ju-Air, a company that offers sightseeing flights on vintage aircraft, and had logged 10,000 hours of flight time. Ownership of the aircraft remained with the Swiss Air Force. It had been used in the films Where Eagles Dare (1968), and Valkyrie (2008) and the 2012 German movie . The aircraft had been issued with a certificate of airworthiness by the Federal Office of Civil Aviation (FOCA) on 6 April 2018, valid for two years.

On the day of the crash, the Junkers was piloted by two veteran captains, aged 62 and 63. Both had extensive experience as pilots for Swissair, Swiss and Edelweiss, as well as more than 30 years of militia service with the Swiss Air Force. Both had several hundred flight hours' worth of experience with the Ju 52. The third crew member was a 66-year-old flight attendant with 40 years of professional experience.

Aftermath

Hiking routes and the local airspace were closed off for the duration of the recovery operation, which involved five helicopters.

Ju-Air suspended all flights by its other Ju 52 aircraft for two weeks, until they resumed operations on 17 August under stricter conditions.

Following a review in March 2019, while the accident investigation was still ongoing, the FOCA banned Ju-Air from conducting commercial passenger flights with Ju 52s, allowing only private flights for club members. Later, the operating and maintenance licenses were revoked for the other Swiss-based Ju 52 aircraft, effectively grounding the HB-HOP and HB-HOS sister aircraft. Due to the maintenance troubles found in the HB-HOT wreck - like fatigue cracks, corrosion and sub-standard repair work - the FOCA deemed them unsafe to fly.

Investigation

The accident was investigated jointly by the Swiss Transportation Safety Investigation Board (STSB) and the cantonal police of Grisons on behalf of the federal and cantonal prosecutors' offices.

A spokesperson for the STSB said that the Junkers "fell like a stone to the ground", and that the heatwave in Europe could have been a factor in the crash, as heat reduces an aircraft's climb performance. The police indicated that no distress signal was received from the aircraft prior to the crash. Investigators ruled out a collision with a cable or another aircraft, and said that there was no indication of foul play or the aircraft losing parts before the crash. The aircraft was not fitted with any flight recorders, as they were not required due to the age of the aircraft. Investigators hoped to find some relevant information from passengers' personal photographic and video recordings during the sightseeing flight. The STSB issued its preliminary report on 15 August 2018. An intermediate report was issued on 20 November 2018, citing anterior corrosion marks and cracks, not related to the accident, which effectively grounded the two remaining Ju-52 of Ju-Air (HB-HOP and HB-HOS) until further investigation of these airframe and engine issues.

In August the SonntagsZeitung newspaper published excerpts from a leaked draft of the investigation report, which said: the pilots flew into a high-altitude alpine valley without a safe possibility of turning back; the accident pilots were already known for questionable decisions; and even on check flights, one of the pilots ignored the minimum altitudes. Other causes such as technical failures had been ruled out.

On January 28, 2021, a final report was released by the STSB which stated that "the pilots' high-risk flying was a direct cause of the accident", and that "the flight crew piloted the aircraft, at low altitude, with no possibility of an alternative flight path and at an air speed that was dangerously low for the circumstances. The high-risk manner of flying through these not unusual turbulences caused the pilot to lose control of the aircraft. The aircraft was also being operated with its centre of gravity in excess of its rear limit". The STSB found that the aircraft was not in an airworthy condition when it took off on the accident flight, in that the engines had not been properly maintained and were not producing rated power. The report indicated that the company had a poor safety culture that tolerated risky behaviour and rule breaking.

See also 
 List of accidents and incidents involving the Junkers Ju 52
 List of airworthy Ju 52s

References

External links

Video animation of accident flight (in English, published by the Swiss Transportation Safety Investigation Board).

2018 in Switzerland
Accidents and incidents involving the Junkers Ju 52
August 2018 events in Switzerland
Aviation accidents and incidents in 2018
Aviation accidents and incidents in Switzerland
Aviation accidents and incidents caused by pilot error
2018 disasters in Switzerland